Avinash Vasantrao Vaidya, (born 24 January 1967, Hubli, Karnataka) is a former Indian cricketer who played for Karnataka as a right-handed batsman wicketkeeper between 1992 and 1998.

References

Indian cricketers
Karnataka cricketers
South Zone cricketers
Living people
1967 births
People from Hubli
Cricketers from Karnataka
Wicket-keepers